Mohsen Rezaee is a Taekwondo athlete who is a member of national Taekwondo team in Afghanistan.

Sport activity 
He is the first person on history of Afghanistan who could become the Asian champion, and the best Taekwondo fighter in Afghanistan for three years in succession.

Mohsen Rezaee had been become a member of 'CAN Home appliances team' in Iran premier league in 2018, and he fought for the 'Refugee Taekwondo athletes center team' in Iran premier league in 2019, moreover he made an official deal with 'Sanat Mes Kerman' in Iran premier league for two years in 2020.

In addition, he became the Asian champion in 2021. This championship took place in Lebanon while this is the first championship of an Afghan athlete in Asia, so that no one in Afghanistan couldn't win such Asian gold medal among all Olympic sport fields so far. He is 17th in the world rankings at the moment, and among all Afghan Taekwondo fighters has the highest world rankings.

References 

1998 births
Living people
Afghan taekwondo practitioners